Armand Mahan (born September 7, 1983) is an Ivorian professional association football player. He is usually positioned as a left back or left winger.

Career 
Mahan played during his youth for ASEC Mimosas. He moved to Belgium in 2003, when he signed a contract with SK Beveren who worked together with the Ivorian team via the Frenchman Jean-Marc Guillou. Several other more famous players made this same move, such as Emmanuel Eboué, Arthur Boka, Romaric and Yaya Touré.

In the Jupiler League 2006-07 season, SK Beveren ended 18th and last in the league. As a result, they were relegated to the Belgian Second Division. Mahan, being end of contract at Beveren, was offered a contract by Cercle Brugge about two weeks after the end of the season, a contract which he accepted. This way, despite relegation, Mahan still played at the highest level of Belgian football. However, at the end of the 2007-08 season, he was given a free transfer.

References
 Armand Mahan player info at Sportwereld.be 
 Armand Mahan player info at the official Cercle Brugge site

Notes

Ivorian footballers
Ivory Coast under-20 international footballers
Ivory Coast international footballers
Association football fullbacks
Association football wingers
K.S.K. Beveren players
Cercle Brugge K.S.V. players
1983 births
Living people
Ivorian expatriates in Belgium
Footballers from Abidjan
Belgian Pro League players
Expatriate footballers in Belgium